Răzvan Ilișescu (born 9 December 1993) is a Romanian rugby union player who currently plays for Fédérale 1 club SC Mazamet. He also plays for Romania's national team the Oaks.

References

External links

1993 births
Living people
People from Cognac, France
French people of Romanian descent
Romanian rugby union players
Romania international rugby union players
Rugby union flankers